Jumit (also Romanized as Jūmīt; also known as Ānkhor and Jūmīt Chehel Gazī) is a village in Gowharan Rural District, Gowharan District, Bashagard County, Hormozgan Province, Iran. At the 2006 census, its population was 26, in 8 families.

References 

Populated places in Bashagard County